Jara or JARA may refer to:

Places
Jara, Ethiopia, administrative center of Gololcha woreda
Jara (Asunción), Paraguay, a barrio (neighborhood) of Asunción
Jara, Kutch, Gujarat, India, a village
Jara Lake, Bolivia
Jara, a tributary of the Șușița in Romania
Jara (Šventoji), a tributary of the Šventoji in Lithuania

People
 Diarra, French spelling of the West African clan name, originally Jara
 Jara (surname), a list of people with the surname

Other uses
 Jara (beehive)
Jara language, a Nigerian language 
Jarāmaraṇa (Jarā) (Pali), often translated as "aging," a fundamental aspect of the Buddhist notion of suffering
Japan Robot Association, a Japanese trade association made up of companies in the robotics industry
Jara High School, West Bengal, India
Jára Cimrman, a fictitious Czech polymath

See also
 La Jara (disambiguation)
 Jara Saguier, a list of brothers with the surname
 Jarra (disambiguation)
 Jarah, a minor Biblical figure